Nambaroo is an extinct genus of macropod marsupial from the late Oligocene to the early Miocene of Australia.

Recent research suggests that the many species belonging to this genus may be either be invalid or belong to the closely related Ganawamaya.

Sources

"Granddaddy of Kangaroos" Found in Aussie Fossil at National Geographic

Prehistoric macropods
Oligocene marsupials
Miocene marsupials
Tortonian extinctions
Chattian genus first appearances
Oligocene mammals of Australia
Miocene mammals of Australia
Fossil taxa described in 1986